Depil is a village in the Faroe Islands.

Depil is located on the east side of Borðoy between Norðdepil and Norðtoftir. The village has only two inhabitants.

The Farmstead in Depil
In the early 19th century the village of Depil was practically derelict.  The farmers had left the place, the ownership of the land was in the hands of outsiders, and half the cultivated soil had turned into wilderness again.  At the census in 1801, there were only three old people left, and the village was probably abandoned for some years up to 1815.

But in the fall of 1815, a man called Óli Árantsson, born 1766, and his wife Anna Óladóttir moved from Norðtoftir to Depil, and life returned to the ancient village.
The story tells, that it was Guttorm Guttormsson who in 1815 built the oldest part of the farmstead in Depil. The lowest part of the house is younger, and the upper part was built by Tummas í Depli in 1823, who used driftwood as building material.

See also
 List of towns in the Faroe Islands

References

External links
Faroeislands.dk: Depil Images and description of all cities on the Faroe Islands.

Populated places in the Faroe Islands